Bruno Silva Mendonca (born 4 April 1985 in Santos, São Paulo) is a Brazilian judoka.

He won the gold medal in the 2011 Pan American Games in the Lightweight category of the Judo.

He competed in the men's 73 kg event at the 2012 Summer Olympics; after defeating Fred Yannick Uwase in the second round, he was eliminated by Dex Elmont in the third round.

References

External links
 
 

1985 births
Living people
Olympic judoka of Brazil
Judoka at the 2012 Summer Olympics
Brazilian male judoka
Pan American Games gold medalists for Brazil
Pan American Games medalists in judo
South American Games bronze medalists for Brazil
South American Games medalists in judo
Judoka at the 2011 Pan American Games
Competitors at the 2010 South American Games
Medalists at the 2011 Pan American Games
Sportspeople from Santos, São Paulo
21st-century Brazilian people
20th-century Brazilian people